Megachile minima is a species of bee in the family Megachilidae. It was described by Ashmead in 1900.

References

Minima
Insects described in 1900